National Police Corps, colloquially in English as Dutch National Police or National Police Force,  is divided in ten regional units, a central unit, the police academy, police services center, and national control room cooperation. The law-enforcement purposes of these agencies are the investigation of suspected criminal activity, referral of the results of investigations to the courts, and the temporary detention of suspected criminals pending judicial action. Law enforcement agencies, to varying degrees at different levels of government and in different agencies, are also commonly charged with the responsibilities of deterring criminal activity and preventing the successful commission of crimes in progress. The police commissioner (eerste hoofdcommissaris) in the Netherlands is Henk van Essen since May 1, 2020.

Besides police officers, the Netherlands has about 23,500 peace officers. These officers have a Special Enforcement Officer (SEO) status (Buitengewoon Opsporingsambtenaar) or BOA/Handhaving in Dutch and therefore have police powers (detaining suspects, ask for identification, make an arrest, issue fines within their power of offences and use force). They can be found within the transport police, game wardens and local enforcement agencies. The majority of BOA officers have the authority to carry and use handcuffs which can only be issued to officers who have the power to use force. A few councils also issue their officers, with permission from the Ministry of Safety and Justice, police batons, pepper spray and occasionally firearms.

Their task depends on their area of operation. A game warden enforces nature laws, while a local enforcement officer enforces local ordinances and municipal code infractions. In 2018 unions were concerned with the increase of violence against these officers and had decided to make the consideration towards whether they would equip all these officers with the less-lethal weapons, batons and pepper spray, or make them part of the national police force.

Organization

From the end of 1945 until 1993, the Dutch police was composed of the municipal police and the national police. In 1994, the police was reorganized into 25 regional constabularies and a National Constabulary. In 2013 the police in the Netherlands was reorganised again into its current structure. In the event of serious emergencies, the police cooperates with the fire brigade, ambulance service, other government agencies and military forces in the security region corresponding to the police region.

Regional units

Every  regionale eenheid (regional unit) is led by a unitchef (unit chief), a Hoofdcommissaris (Chief Commissioner) who conducts the day-to-day police force management. Decisions about the principal law enforcement policies are made by a regional board, the so-called Driehoek (triangle) whose chairman is the eenheidsbeheerder (unit manager). The eenheidsbeheerder is usually the mayor of the largest municipality in the region. The other board members of the Driehoek are the unit chief and the local chief prosecutor.

A region consists of several districts, each having a district chief. Each district consists of a number of local units, called basiseenheden (basic units) or teams.

The "police strength", the number of constables and other police employees in a region is determined by the number of inhabitants and the amount of crime in the region. So the smallest force counts about 300 police officers, while the largest one counts more than 5,000 police employees. There are about 55,000 police employees serving in the Netherlands.

Selected police officers may also be deployed in a riot police mobile unit. Mobile units are called in to deal with serious public order offences. Each police region has one or more units on stand-by for a total of 45 mobile units nationwide, each of which has about 50 members (including middle-ranking and senior officers). Nine units have also been trained to respond to incidents on maritime vessels. The mobile unit also incorporates plain clothes units known as 'aanhoudingseenheden'. These groups target specific suspects of public order offenses.

The National Unit

The landelijke eenheid (National Unit, LE) is led by a unitchief, a Chief Commissioner who conducts the day-to-day police force management. Decisions about the principal law enforcement policies for the national unit are made by a national board, the triangle whose chairman is the minister of Justice and Security. The other board members are the unit chief and the national chief prosecutor.
The LE provides eleven operational services, including:

Dienst Landelijk Operationeel Centrum

Dienst Landelijke Recherche

Dienst Landelijke Informatieorganisatie

Dienst Specialistische Operaties

Dienst Infrastructuur

Dienst Koninklijke en Diplomatieke Beviliging

Dienst Speciale Interventies 

The LE is responsible for policing on the roads, waterways, railways and in the air. It also combats domestic and cross-border serious/organised crime and terrorism. For that last purpose the LE has operational command of all anti-terror police units. The national unit supports the regional police units with specialised means such as police horse and dog teams; provides witness protection. A last task is the protection of members of the Dutch Royal Family and other dignitaries (e.g., diplomats and politicians) as assigned by the authorised minister.

Police Academy
Coming soon

Police Services Center 
coming soon

National Control Room Cooperation 
The Landelijke Meldkamer Samenwerking or LMS is a relatively independent  division of the police. The LMS manages and operates 10 shared emergency service control rooms/dispatch centers. Each control room houses police, ambulance services,  fire brigade, and military police  units. If one center can't operate another center can take over. These centers receive calls to 112 that automatically get directed to the national control room, then they get put through to the right region. From there an operator asks and puts you through to the right service section in the building, the operator of that service directs the units to the location and gives them details as they come in, the operator also sees the units locations to be able to choose the closest units. The operator also determines if the situation is an emergency, and what priority the situation is, there are three priorities.

Priority one 
use of lights and sirens, the vehicle is considered a priority vehicle.

priority  two 
No use of lights and sirens, but the unit does have certain exemptions like driving the wrong way, parking on the sidewalk, etc.

Priority three 
No use of lights or sirens and no exemptions, the vehicle is a regular road user.

List of control rooms/dispatch/communication centers 
coming soon

Ranks
Within the Dutch police the following ranks are in use:

Equipment

Basically the equipment of every Dutch police officer consists of the following:

 A smartphone (currently Samsung S21) with the MEOS app, giving access to all required police databases
 SHN handcuffs
 Bonowi EKA 51 Camlock
 Pepper spray from TW 1000
 Walther P99Q NL  
C2000 radio

Police trainees are armed with a handgun when they pass their handgun training; before passing the trainee performs his/her duties with only pepper spray, handcuffs, and baton.

The German-made Walther P5 used since 1978 while Arrest- and Support units were armed with the Austrian-made Glock 17 pistol and/or a submachine gun, usually the German-made Heckler & Koch MP5.

It was originally planned to be replaced by the SIG Sauer PPNL, a 9×19mm Parabellum version of the SIG Sauer P250, but the contract was canceled due to the failure of several safety tests.

Vehicles
The Dutch National Police uses a selection of motor vehicles for its tasks. The current fleet of the DNP is made up of mostly Mercedes-Benz and Audi, but some Volkswagen vehicles still remain from a contract that ended in 2018. The vehicles the DNP uses are divided in marked and unmarked vehicles. The marked units  are white with blue and red striping on the side and carrying a light bar on the roof. The cars are fitted with better suspension, megaphone and multiple communication devices on board. The back is fitted with a container for various hand tools. Distinct are the riot control units (ME) and the SWAT (AT) units of the DNP.

Main all-purpose patrol vehicle:

 Volkswagen Touran 
 Is being replaced by the Mercedes-Benz B-Class
 Also used as K-9 unit
All-purpose vehicle:

 Volkswagen Transporter (T5)
 Is being replaced by Mercedes-Benz Vito

Fast intervention Unit (LE)

 Audi A6

Riot police transport (ME)

 Mercedes-Benz Sprinter
 Also used as K-9 unit (4 dogs) and video observation vehicle.

For various other tasks the DNP uses:

Audi A4 (Arrest and Support unit)
Audi A4 Sedan (security of the Royal House and politicians)
Audi A6 (unmarked police)
BMW 5 Series (special firearms team or security of the Royal House and politicians, Arrest and Support unit)
BMW X5 (Arrest and Support unit, Royal House/politicians security)
Mercedes-Benz C-Class sedan (unmarked traffic police)
Mercedes-Benz E-Class (unmarked (traffic) police)
Mercedes-Benz Sprinter (mostly used by the unit "accident analysation")
Mercedes-Benz Vario (for the transport of special bomb dogs, semi-unmarked)
Nissan Patrol (armoured vehicle, 4x4 vehicle or not armoured for beach patrols)
Opel Insignia (unmarked police)
Opel Vivaro (forensic teams or dog transport, sometimes still in use as police patrol van)
Škoda Superb (unmarked police)
Toyota Land Cruiser (armoured and unmarked vehicle for special security operations)
Volkswagen Amarok (4x4 vehicle)
Volkswagen Caddy
Volkswagen Golf (for normal surveillance and also as unmarked police)
Volkswagen Golf GTD (traffic police)
Volkswagen Golf Plus (not used in the whole country)
Volkswagen Golf Variant (for normal patrols)
Volkswagen Polo (also as unmarked car for normal patrols)
Volkswagen Passat (also as unmarked police)
Volkswagen Transporter (T5) (unmarked for special firearms teams and marked for normal patrol)
Volkswagen Touran (standard patrol car and also as unmarked police)
Volkswagen Touareg (armoured vehicle for airports and political buildings)
Volvo S60 (for personnel of the Royal House)

retired or currently being replaced cars 

 Mercedes-Benz G-Class (retired)
 opel astra (retired)
 Ford F350  (retired)
 volvo v50 (retired)
 volvo v70 (retired)
 jeep wrangler (retired)

Tasks

Since 2012, the new Dutch Police Law (Politiewet 2012) passed. The article which describes the police,  has been changed from article 2, to article 3.

Article 3 of the Dutch Police law describes what the missions of the police are: "The task of the police is to, in subordination to the authorities and complying with applicable law, take care of the actual upholding of the legal order and to supply aid to those who need it." In practice this comes down to four main missions.
Prevention (preventing offences and crimes)
Investigation of crimes and offences
Upholding the legal order
Supplying assistance to civil authorities

Within the police, several departments are occupied with parts of these main tasks.

Communications centre
All calls to the national police number 0900-8844 come in around the clock.

Systems in use
For a number of years, the communications centres have used the Gemeenschappelijk Meldkamer Systeem (Common Communications Centre System, GMS). This system has a lot of functions. In the first place it functions as a plotting screen which displays every unit logged in. It also has a database function for procedures and phone numbers necessary for correctly executing police work and it links to the C2000 system and the CityGIS (GPS) system.

C2000 is the digital, secure communications system and, with CityGIS, police cars can be tracked on a map using GPS, which can be reported to the communications centre using a VDO navigation system.

Basic police work

In the Netherlands basic police work consists of the following tasks:
Visible public policing: being visibly present on the street, on foot or in a marked car, prevents people from committing offences and crimes.
Basic detective work: investigating petty thefts and burglaries is part of basic police work; when the case takes up too much time, it is transferred to the special branch.
Giving crime prevention advice: giving advice on how to deter burglaries, advising municipalities on traffic issues, consultancy, etc.
Providing assistance: assistance is provided to those who ask for it but also to game wardens, municipalities and other civil authorities etc.
Dealing with traffic issues: traffic surveillance, handling traffic accidents, advising citizens and municipalities, traffic congestion security.
Maintaining laws and regulations (often in conjunction with the special service): e.g., checking if foreigners are in possession of the right documents (visa, residence permit, work permit etc.) in cooperation with the immigration service.
Special tasks: apart from daily activities a few special tasks are part of basic policing; these are executed independently or in conjunction with normal police activities, like the vice squad.
National, (inter)regional investigations: investigating serious crimes such as murder, drug trafficking, trafficking in human beings, youth delinquency, arms trade, fraud, big environmental cases and sexual offences; the detectives are often supported by specialists.
Information management: gathering and processing technical information (such as photographs and finger prints) and information about criminal organisations by for example the Criminele Inlichtingen Eenheid (Criminal Intelligence Unit, CIE).
Aliens: issuing residence permits and supervising people staying in the Netherlands who don't have Dutch citizenship.
Environmental service: because environmental law is complex, this is a specialist mission. In several Dutch municipalities these tasks are entrusted to a special Milieupolitie (Environmental police).
Operational support tasks: tasks that support basic law enforcement or specialist tasks, such as police horse and dog care, the Mobiele Eenheid (Mobile Unit, riot control), Aanhoudings- en Ondersteuningseenheid" (Arrest and Supportunit, established for high-risk arrests) and observatieteams (observation teams, OT; comparable to ).

The Dutch government is keen to put more and more police "on the street". This means that the use of ICT will have to be improved so that constables do not lose a lot of time noting all their observations on paper for later use. The uniformed policemen on the street are those of the patrol service.

Sometimes police patrols drive directly from the communications centre to the location where someone requested assistance. This can be a simple case of someone locking their keys inside their car, a complaint about litter or an inconveniently parked car.  There are also more serious calls that need direct attention, like an accident with injuries, a stabbing, a burglary, vandalism; all events where the police has to act and reassure.

Surveillance is not only done from the patrol car, but also from a motorbike or a horse. Especially in crowded malls surveillance is often done on foot or (motor)bike. The men and women on the street have to permanently "keep their eyes open" to spot suspicious behaviour, such as someone walking around looking inside parked cars, cars without working lights or drunken cyclists.

Car owners are told that their lights are broken and why this is dangerous. A constable on foot may tell shop owners to put locks on their shelves outside to prevent shoplifting. If you report on a stolen bike, you'll be told what kind of bike locks are most effective.

The police in a municipality are available 24 hours every day for basic law enforcement. More and more often the police will visit schools to teach pupils about drug prevention, vandalism or sex on the internet. The police in a municipality make sure that what is forbidden isn't done, and that which is mandatory is actually done. They also make sure that anyone who asks for assistance gets it, supported by personnel from the district and the region. Since the early 90s several police regions have been working with neighbourhood teams called neighbourhood supervisors.

Powers

The police have powers "ordinary" people do not have; e.g., an officer can stop or arrest people, or look in a shopping bag for lifted items, or (on authorization of the assistant prosecutor) search a home for arms. The police also have the power to use force. This power is often called the "monopoly on force". The police is one of the few organisations in the Netherlands that are allowed to use force, the use of which is bound by many rules and preconditions.

The power to stop someone is often confused with the power to arrest someone. The power to stop someone is the power of the police to make someone stand still, so that the police can ask for his name and address.

The power to stop someone is the power that enables the arrest of someone. However, this power is not only granted to the police. The Code of Criminal Procedure, article 53, sub 1, reads:
In case of discovery in the act everyone is authorized to stop the suspect.
The term "in the act" meaning "when it just happened".

Stopping someone means holding the suspect while waiting for the arrival of the police. When someone is stopped, he is always brought to a police station for questioning.

The investigative powers of the police are for example described in the Police Law, the Arms and Munitions Law, the Opium Law, the Road Traffic Law 1994, the Entry Law and the Code of Criminal Procedure.

These powers are bound by very strict rules. Some of these powers may be applied by an officer himself, like the examples before. Other police powers, like wiretapping, observation or searching premises, can only be used after permission is granted by the examining judge.

Cooperation with other services
When providing aid the police cooperates with other services. When dealing with an accident for example, the police cooperates with ambulance services, doctors, fire brigade and Royal Marechaussee.

Slachtofferhulp
For providing support to victims the police cooperates with the Bureaus Slachtofferhulp (comparable to Victim Support). The employees of Slachtofferhulp are specially trained to provide support to victims of accidents and crime. They make sure that victims are coached, but they also help with filling in forms for insurance or a lawyer.

Continuing support
The police cooperates closely with support organisations that can continue providing support when the abilities of the police to do so come to an end. A few examples:
Addiction care like the Consultatiebureau voor Alcohol en Drugs, Kentron or Novadic.
Mental health Care (for people who, e.g., want to commit suicide or are a danger to others)
The Reclassering Nederland (the Dutch parole office)
The youth parole office
The Raad voor de Kinderbescherming'' (comparable to the Children and Family Court Advisory and Support Service)
Social work, e.g., in case of domestic violence

See also
Criminal justice system of the Netherlands
Law of the Netherlands
Royal Marechaussee
Fiscal Information and Investigation Service

References

External links

 Politie.nl (in Dutch), website of the National Police Corps
 landelijkemeldkamer.org (in Dutch), website of the Control Room Cooperation

 
National law enforcement agencies of the Netherlands